Marco Monteiro (born 23 July 1966) is a Brazilian gymnast. He competed in seven events at the 1992 Summer Olympics.

References

External links
 

1966 births
Living people
Brazilian male artistic gymnasts
Olympic gymnasts of Brazil
Gymnasts at the 1992 Summer Olympics
Sportspeople from Rio de Janeiro (city)
Gymnasts at the 1987 Pan American Games
Pan American Games bronze medalists for Brazil
Pan American Games medalists in gymnastics
Medalists at the 1987 Pan American Games